Anthomyia obscuripennis is a species of fly in the family Anthomyiidae. It is found in the United States.

References

External links 
 
 Anthomyia obscuripennis at insectoid.info

Anthomyiidae
Insects described in 1886
Insects of the United States
Taxa named by Jacques-Marie-Frangile Bigot